Never Gets Old is the ninth studio album by American country music artist Joe Nichols. It was released on July 28, 2017 by Red Bow Records. The album includes the singles "Never Gets Old" and "Billy Graham's Bible".

Content
The album includes "Billy Graham's Bible", which previously appeared on his 2013 album Crickets. It also includes a cover of Sir Mix-a-Lot's "Baby Got Back", performed with comedian Darren Knight.

Mickey Jack Cones produced most of the album except for "Diamonds Make Babies" and "Never Gets Old" (produced by Brent Rowan) and "Billy Graham's Bible" (produced by Cones & Tony Brown).

"Diamonds Make Babies" previously appeared on Dierks Bentley's 2012 album, Home. And It Also appeared on Bradley gaskin's self titled EP

Critical reception
Stephen Thomas Erlewine rated the album 3.5 out of 5 stars. His review noted more modern influences in the production and lyrics, and praised Nichols' "easy touch" on the songs. He concluded his review by stating that "He's an old-fashioned guy who is happy living in the modern world, and that's why Never Gets Old is so appealing: It feels familiar yet fresh."

Track listing
"Diamonds Make Babies" (Jim Beavers, Lee Thomas Miller, Chris Stapleton) - 3:21
"Girl in the Song" (Neal Coty, Lynn Hutton) - 3:39
"We All Carry Something" (Westin Davis, Justin Weaver) - 3:26
"I'd Sing About You" (Chris Janson, Preston Brust, Chris Lucas) - 3:13
"Breathless" (Zach Crowell, Matt Jenkins, Jon Nite) - 3:55
"Tall Boys" (Monty Criswell, Shane Minor, Tom Shapiro) - 2:48
"Hostage" (Aaron Eshuis, Ryan Lafferty, Brett Tyler) - 2:56
"Never Gets Old" (Connie Harrington, Steve Moakler) - 3:37
"Billy Graham's Bible" (Coty, Chris DuBois, Jimmy Melton) - 3:06
"So You're Saying" (Ross Copperman, Josh Kear, Chris Tompkins) - 3:41
"This Side of the River" (Jeremy Crady, Clint Daniels, Justin Lantz) - 3:20
"Baby Got Back" (Anthony Ray) - 2:56
featuring Darren Knight

Personnel
Adapted from AllMusic

Eddie Bayers - drums
Pat Buchanan - electric guitar
Hailey Cirovski - background vocals
Jackson Daniel Cones - background vocals
Mickey Jack Cones - acoustic guitar, electric guitar, keyboards, programming, background vocals
Shannon Cones - background vocals
J.T. Corenflos - electric guitar
David Dorn - keyboards
Dan Dugmore - steel guitar
Jeneé Fleenor - fiddle
Shannon Forrest - drums
Kenny Greenberg - acoustic guitar
Tony Harrell - keyboards
Aubrey Haynie - fiddle
Wes Hightower - background vocals
Mark Hill - bass guitar
Mike Johnson - steel guitar
Charlie Judge - keyboards
Jeff King - electric guitar
Darren Knight - featured vocals on "Baby Got Back"
Troy Lancaster - electric guitar
Tim Lauer - accordion
B. James Lowry - acoustic guitar
Gordon Mote - keyboards
Steve Nathan - keyboards
Joe Nichols - lead vocals
Russ Pahl - steel guitar
Brent Rowan - acoustic guitar, electric guitar
Dave Salley - background vocals
Russell Terrell - background vocals
Brady Tilow - programming, background vocals
Ilya Toshinsky - acoustic guitar
Lonnie Wilson - drums
Glenn Worf - bass guitar
Craig Young - bass guitar

Chart performance

References

2017 albums
Joe Nichols albums
BBR Music Group albums